The 2015–16 Cuban National Series was the 55th season of the league. Ciego de Ávila defeated Pinar del Río in the series' final round. This was the first time a reigning Cuban National Series champion had retained their title for 8 years.

References

Cuban National Series seasons
Cuban National Series
Cuban National Series